Arotrophora kundasanga is a species of moth of the family Tortricidae primarily found in Sabah on Borneo.

The wingspan is about 14 mm. The forewings are cream, preserved in the basal half of the wing. The ground colour is suffused and sprinkled with rust and grey brown along the costa. The remaining area of the wing is grey brown and grey, spotted with grey brown. The hindwings are brownish cream.

Etymology
The species name refers to the Kundasang golf course, the type locality.

References

Moths described in 2009
Arotrophora
Moths of Asia